Santo Antônio (Portuguese for "Saint Anthony") is a municipality (município) in the state of Rio Grande do Norte in Brazil. The population in 2020 was 24,280 and the area is 301 km2. The elevation is 92 m.

References

External links
citybrazil.com.br

Municipalities in Rio Grande do Norte